Tulosesus bisporus is a species of mushroom producing fungus in the family Psathyrellaceae.

Taxonomy 
It was first described as Coprinus bisporus by mycologist Jakob Emanuel Lange in 1915.

In 2001 a phylogenetic study resulted in a major reorganization and reshuffling of that genus and this species was transferred to Coprinellus.

The species was known as Coprinellus bisporus until 2020 when the German mycologists Dieter Wächter & Andreas Melzer reclassified many species in the Psathyrellaceae family based on phylogenetic analysis.

References

bisporus
Fungi described in 1915
Tulosesus